The 2015 UEFA European Under-19 Championship was the 14th edition of the UEFA European Under-19 Championship (64th edition if the Under-18 and Junior eras are included), the annual European youth football competition contested by the men's under-19 national teams of the member associations of UEFA. Greece hosted the tournament. Players born on or after 1 January 1996 were eligible to participate in this competition.

Qualification

All 54 UEFA nations entered the competition and with the hosts Greece qualifying automatically, the other 53 teams competed in the qualifying competition to determine the remaining seven spots in the final tournament. The qualifying competition consisted of two rounds: Qualifying round, which took place in autumn 2014, and Elite round, which took place in spring 2015.

Qualified teams
The following eight teams qualified for the final tournament.

Note: All appearance statistics include only U-19 era (since 2002).

Final draw
The final draw was held in Katerini, Greece on 9 June 2015 at 17:00 EEST (UTC+3). The eight teams were drawn into two groups of four teams. There were no seeding except that the hosts Greece were assigned to position A1 in the draw.

Venues
The competition was played at three venues in three host cities, Katerini and Veria in Central Macedonia, and Larissa in Thessaly.

Squads

Each national team had to submit a squad of 18 players.

Match officials
A total of 6 referees, 8 assistant referees and 2 fourth officials were appointed for the final tournament.

Referees
 Tamás Bognár (Hungary)
 Andreas Ekberg (Sweden)
 Marco Guida (Italy)
 Georgi Kabakov (Bulgaria)
 Anthony Taylor (England)
 Andris Treimanis (Latvia)

Assistant referees
 Petr Blazej (Czech Republic)
 Ricardo Fernandes Morais (Luxembourg)
 Vital Jobin (Switzerland)
 Tomaz Klančnik (Slovenia)
 Dejan Nedelkoski (Macedonia)
 Neeme  Neemlaid (Estonia)
 Nemanja Petrović (Serbia)
 Dennis Rasmussen (Denmark)

Fourth officials
 Athanasios Giahos (Greece)
 Andreas Pappas (Greece)

Group stage

Group winners and runners-up advanced to the semi-finals.

Tiebreakers
if two or more teams were equal on points on completion of the group matches, the following tie-breaking criteria were applied, in the order given, to determine the rankings:
 Higher number of points obtained in the group matches played among the teams in question;
 Superior goal difference resulting from the group matches played among the teams in question;
 Higher number of goals scored in the group matches played among the teams in question;
 If, after having applied criteria 1 to 3, teams still had an equal ranking, criteria 1 to 3 were reapplied exclusively to the group matches between the teams in question to determine their final rankings. If this procedure did not lead to a decision, criteria 5 to 9 applied;
 Superior goal difference in all group matches;
 Higher number of goals scored in all group matches;
 If only two teams had the same number of points, and they were tied according to criteria 1 to 6 after having met in the last round of the group stage, their rankings were determined by a penalty shoot-out (not used if more than two teams had the same number of points, or if their rankings were not relevant for qualification for the next stage).
 Lower disciplinary points total based only on yellow and red cards received in the group matches (red card = 3 points, yellow card = 1 point, expulsion for two yellow cards in one match = 3 points);
 Drawing of lots.

All times were local, EEST (UTC+3).

Group A

Group B

Knockout stage
In the knockout stage, extra time and penalty shoot-out were used to decide the winner if necessary.

Bracket

Semi-finals

Final

Goalscorers
3 goals
 Borja Mayoral

2 goals

 Marko Kvasina
 Moussa Dembélé
 Pelle van Amersfoort
 Nikita Chernov
 Aleksei Gasilin
 Ramil Sheydayev
 Marco Asensio
 Matías Nahuel
 Oleksandr Zubkov

1 goal

 Alexis Blin
 Mouctar Diakhaby
 Sehrou Guirassy
 Thilo Kehrer
 Gianluca Rizzo
 Timo Werner
 Zisis Karahalios
 Petros Orphanides
 Dmitri Barinov
 Igor Bezdenezhnykh
 Mikel Merino
 Valeriy Luchkevych

1 own goal

 Thilo Kehrer (playing against Russia)
 Damon Mirani (playing against Spain)
 Pavlo Lukyanchuk (playing against France)

Team of the tournament

Goalkeepers
 Anton Mitryushkin
 Antonio Sivera
Defenders
 Terry Lartey Sanniez
 Lukas Klünter
 Denis Yakuba
 Lucas Hernandez
 Augustine Loof
 Jesús Vallejo

Midfielders
 Maxwel Cornet
 Issa Kallon
 Dmitri Barinov
 Dani Ceballos
 Kingsley Coman
 Marco Asensio
 Rodri
Forwards
 Timo Werner
 Ramil Sheydayev
 Borja Mayoral

Golden player:  Marco Asensio

References

External links
History – UEFA European Under-19 Championship: 2014/15, UEFA.com
2015 final tournament: Greece, UEFA.com
Official website (Greek)

 
2015
UEFA European Under-19 Championship
2015 UEFA European Under-19 Championship
UEFA European Under-19 Championship
July 2015 sports events in Europe
2015 in youth association football